An onion dome is a dome whose shape resembles an onion. Such domes are often larger in diameter than the tholobate upon which they sit, and their height usually exceeds their width. These bulbous structures taper smoothly to a point.

It is a typical feature of churches belonging to the Russian Orthodox church. There are similar buildings in other Eastern European countries, and occasionally in some Western European countries, like in Germany's Bavaria, Austria, and northeastern Italy. Buildings with onion domes are also found in the Oriental regions of Central and South Asia, and the Middle East. However, the old buildings outside of Russia usually do not have the typical construction of the Russian onion design. The origin of the design is thought to be the native architectural style of early Rus' tribes. 

Other types of Eastern Orthodox cupolas include helmet domes (for example, those  of the Assumption Cathedral in Vladimir), Ukrainian pear domes (Saint Sophia Cathedral in Kyiv), and Baroque bud domes (St. Andrew's Church in Kyiv) or an onion-helmet mixture like the Saint Sophia Cathedral in Novgorod.

History 

According to Wolfgang Born, the onion dome has its origin in Syria, where some Umayyad Caliphate-era mosaics show buildings with bulbous domes. An early prototype of onion dome also appeared in Chehel Dokhter, a mid-11th century Seljuk architecture in Damghan region of Iran.

In Russian architecture 

It is not completely clear when and why onion domes became a typical feature of Russian architecture. The curved onion style appeared outside of Russia, both in the Western world and in the Orient at a later time. But still several theories exist that the Russian onion shape was influenced by countries from the Orient, like India and Persia, with whom Russia has had lengthy cultural exchange. Byzantine churches and architecture of Kievan Rus were characterized by broader, flatter domes without a special framework erected above the drum. In contrast to this ancient form, each drum of a Russian church is surmounted by a special structure of metal or timber, which is lined with sheet iron or tiles, while the onion architecture is mostly very curved. Russian architecture used the dome shape not only for churches but also for other buildings.

By the end of the nineteenth century, most Russian churches from before the Petrine period had bulbous domes. The largest onion domes were erected in the seventeenth century in the area around Yaroslavl. A number of these had more complicated bud-shaped domes, whose form derived from Baroque models of the late seventeenth century. Pear-shaped domes are usually associated with Ukrainian Baroque, while cone-shaped domes are typical for Orthodox churches of Transcaucasia.

Oriental origin hypothesis 

Supposedly, Russian icons painted before the Mongol invasion of Rus' of 1237-1242 do not feature churches with onion domes. Two highly venerated pre-Mongol churches that have been rebuilt—the Assumption Cathedral and the Cathedral of Saint Demetrius, both in  Vladimir—display golden helmet domes. Restoration work on several other ancient churches has revealed some fragments of former helmet-like domes below newer onion cupolas.
It has been posited that onion domes first appeared in Russia during the reign of Ivan the Terrible. The domes of Saint Basil's Cathedral have not been altered since the reign of Ivan's son Fyodor I, indicating the presence of onion domes in sixteenth-century Russia.

Some scholars postulate that the Russians adopted onion domes from  Muslim countries, possibly from the Khanate of Kazan, whose conquest in 1552 Ivan the Terrible commemorated by erecting St. Basil's Cathedral. Some scholars believe that onion domes first appeared in Russian wooden architecture above tent-like churches. According to this theory, they were strictly utilitarian, as they prevented snow from piling on the roof.

Indigenous Russian origin hypothesis 

In 1946, historian Boris Rybakov, while analysing miniatures of ancient Russian chronicles, pointed out that most of them, from the thirteenth century onward, display churches with onion domes rather than helmet domes. Nikolay Voronin, who studied pre-Mongol Russian architecture, seconded his opinion that onion domes existed in Russia as early as the thirteenth century. These findings demonstrated that Russian onion domes could not be imported from the Orient, where onion domes did not replace spherical domes until the fifteenth century.

Modern art historian Sergey Zagraevsky surveyed hundreds of Russian icons and miniatures, from the eleventh century onward. He concluded that most icons painted after the Mongol invasion of Rus display only onion domes. The first onion domes appeared on some pictures from the twelfth century. He found only one icon from the late fifteenth century displaying a dome resembling the helmet instead of an onion. His findings led him to dismiss fragments of helmet domes discovered by restorators beneath modern onion domes as post-Petrine stylisations intended to reproduce the familiar forms of Byzantine cupolas. Zagraevsky also indicated that the oldest depictions of the two Vladimir cathedrals represent them as having onion domes, prior to their replacement by classicizing helmet domes. He explains the ubiquitous appearance of onion domes in the late thirteenth century by the general emphasis on verticality characteristic of Russian church architecture from the late twelfth to early fifteenth centuries. At that time, porches, pilasters, vaults and drums were arranged to create a vertical thrust, to make the church seem taller than it was. Another consideration proposed by Zagraevsky links the onion-shaped form of Russian domes with the weight of traditional Russian crosses, which are much larger and more elaborate than those used in Byzantium and Kievan Rus. Such ponderous crosses would have been easily toppled, if they had not been fixed to sizeable stones traditionally placed inside the elongated domes of Russian churches. It is impossible to place such a stone inside the flat dome of the Byzantine type.

Symbolism 

Prior to the eighteenth century, the Russian Orthodox Church did not assign any particular symbolism to the exterior shape of a church. Nevertheless, onion domes are popularly believed to symbolise burning candles. In 1917, religious philosopher Prince Evgenii Troubetzkoy argued that the onion shape of Russian church domes may not be explained rationally. According to Trubetskoy, drums crowned by tapering domes were deliberately scored to resemble candles, thus manifesting a certain aesthetic and religious attitude.

Another explanation has it that the onion dome was originally regarded as a form reminiscent of the aedicula (cubiculum) in the Church of the Holy Sepulchre in Jerusalem.

Onion domes often appear in groups of three, representing the Holy Trinity, or five, representing Jesus Christ and the Four Evangelists. Domes standing alone represent Jesus. Vasily Tatischev, the first to record this interpretation, disapproved of it emphatically. He believed that the five-domed design of churches was propagated by Patriarch Nikon, who liked to compare the central and highest dome with himself and four lateral domes with four other patriarchs of the Orthodox world. There is no other evidence that Nikon ever held such a view.

The domes are often brightly painted: their colors may informally symbolise different aspects of religion. Green, blue, and gold domes are sometimes held to represent the Holy Trinity, the Holy Spirit, and Jesus, respectively. Black ball-shaped domes were once popular in the snowy north of Russia.

Internationally

Asia

South Asia

The onion dome was also used extensively in Mughal architecture, which later went on to influence Indo-Saracenic architecture. It is also a common feature in Sikh architecture, particularly in Gurudwaras, and sometimes seen in Rajput architecture as well.

Elsewhere in Asia
Outside the Indian subcontinent, it is also used in Iran and other places in the Middle East and Central Asia.  At the end of the 19th century, the Dutch-built Baiturrahman Grand Mosque in Aceh, Indonesia, which incorporated onion shaped dome.  The shape of the dome has been used in numerous mosques in Indonesia since then.

Europe

Western and Central countries
Baroque domes in the shape of an onion (or other vegetables or flower-buds) were common in the Holy Roman Empire as well. The first one was built in 1576 by the architect Johannes Holl (1512–1594) on the church of the Convent of the Franciscan Sisters of Maria Stern in Augsburg. Usually made of copper sheet, onion domes appear on Catholic churches all over southern Germany, Czech lands, Austria and Sardinia and Northeast Italy. Onion domes were also a favourite of 20th-century Austrian architectural designer Friedensreich Hundertwasser.

Southern countries

The Americas
The World's Only Corn Palace, a tourist attraction and basketball arena in Mitchell, South Dakota, also features onion domes on the roof of the structure.

See also
 List of roof shapes
 Giboshi

Notes and references

External links 
 

Architectural elements
Domes
Architecture in Russia
Russian inventions
Plants in art